Ivo Prorok (born December 28, 1969) is a Czech former professional ice hockey left winger.

Prorok played in the Czechoslovak First Ice Hockey League and the Czech Extraliga for HC Litvínov, HC Slavia Praha, HC Vítkovice and HC Plzeň. He also played in the Tipsport Liga in Slovakia for HKM Zvolen and the Oddset Ligaen in Denmark for the Esbjerg Oilers.

Prorok also played for the Czech Republic national ice hockey team and played in the 2006 World Ice Hockey Championships.

References

External links

1969 births
Living people
Czech ice hockey right wingers
EfB Ishockey players
GCK Lions players
HC Litvínov players
HC Most players
Sportspeople from Karviná
HC Plzeň players
HC Slavia Praha players
HC Slovan Ústečtí Lvi players
HC Tábor players
HC Vítkovice players
HKM Zvolen players
Czechoslovak ice hockey right wingers
Czech expatriate ice hockey players in Switzerland
Czech expatriate ice hockey players in Slovakia
Czech expatriate sportspeople in Denmark
Expatriate ice hockey players in Denmark